Thomas Raymond Gingeras is an American geneticist and professor at Cold Spring Harbor Laboratory. He is a leader of the National Institutes of Health's ENCODE project. He worked at Affymetrix as Vice President of Biological Sciences before joining CSHL. In 2019, he was listed as an ISI Highly Cited Researcher.
His son is the historian Ryan Gingeras.

References

External links
Faculty page
Lab website

Living people
American geneticists
New York University alumni
Year of birth missing (living people)